Melody McCray-Miller (November 18, 1956) was a Democratic member of the Kansas House of Representatives, representing the 89th district.  She served from 2005 through 2013.

Prior to her election to the House, McCray-Miller served as a Wichita city commissioner and on the local school board.  She serves on the Executive Board of Center for Health and Wellness, the Advisory Board for Wichita Children's Home, and the Grant Chapel A.M.E. Steward Board.

McCray- Miller received her BA in Psychology from the University of Houston and a secondary school teaching certificate from Wichita State University. Her father is Billy McCray, a longtime state legislator.

Committee membership
 Taxation
 Corrections and Juvenile Justice (Ranking Member)
 Government Efficiency and Fiscal Oversight
She took office from former seat holder the late Ruby Gilbert

Major donors
The top 5 donors to McCray-Miller's 2008 campaign:
1. Kansans for Lifesaving Cures 	$750 	
2. Kansas Contractors Assoc 	$500 	
3. AT&T 	$500 	
4. Chesapeake Energy 	$500 	
5. Kansas Contractor Assoc 	$500

References

External links
 Kansas Legislature - Melody McCray-Miller
 Project Vote Smart profile
 Kansas Votes profile
 Campaign contributions: 2004, 2006, 2008

School board members in Kansas
Kansas city council members
Democratic Party members of the Kansas House of Representatives
Living people
Wichita State University alumni
Women state legislators in Kansas
University of Houston alumni
Women city councillors in Kansas
21st-century American women politicians
21st-century American politicians
1956 births